The Killing of a Sacred Deer is a 2017 psychological horror thriller film directed by Yorgos Lanthimos and starring Colin Farrell, Nicole Kidman, Barry Keoghan, Raffey Cassidy, Sunny Suljic, Alicia Silverstone, and Bill Camp. The screenplay by Lanthimos and Efthymis Filippou was inspired by the ancient Greek tragedy Iphigenia in Aulis by Euripides, and follows a cardiac surgeon who introduces his family to a teenage boy with a connection to his past, after which they mysteriously begin to fall ill.

The film was selected to compete for the Palme d'Or in the main competition section of the 2017 Cannes Film Festival. It was theatrically released in the United States by A24 on 20 October 2017, and in the United Kingdom and Ireland by Curzon Artificial Eye on 3 November. Critical response to the film was mostly positive, and it grossed over $7 million worldwide.

Plot
After performing an open heart surgery, Steven Murphy, a cardiothoracic surgeon in Cincinnati, goes to a diner to meet 16-year-old Martin Lang, whose father died a few years earlier. Murphy then goes home to his wife, Anna, and their children, Kim, who is 14, and Bob, who is younger. Steven invites Martin to meet his family, and Martin gets along with everyone, especially Kim. That night, Martin calls to say he has already told his mother that Steven is coming to dinner the following evening. Martin insists Steven stay to watch a movie after the meal, but he leaves partway through to go to bed, and his mother gets amorous with Steven. She says Martin wants it as much as she does, and Steven leaves.

Martin visits Steven's office, complaining of chest pain he worries is caused by the same condition that killed his father. The cardiac stress tests Steven runs show nothing wrong, and Martin invites Steven over again, saying his mother finds Steven attractive, but Steven responds that he is happy with his family. After this, Martin's demands for Steven's attention grow increasingly frequent and desperate, and Steven stops responding. He is troubled when Kim tells him that Martin gave her a ride home.

One morning, Bob says he cannot move his legs, so Steven and Anna rush him to the hospital. He recovers during his examination and is sent home, but then relapses and is admitted while more tests are done. Martin visits Bob and talks with Steven to explain that, to "balance things" for his father's death, which occurred in Steven's operating room, Steven must kill either Bob, Kim, or Anna, or else, within a few days, they will all die after becoming paralyzed, refusing to eat, and bleeding from the eyes. Steven has Martin escorted from the hospital and is troubled to see Bob refusing to eat.

Bob's condition does not improve, but no cause can be found. Kim, who has fallen in love with Martin, collapses and is also hospitalized. She chokes when Steven tries to make her eat, and she and Bob are given feeding tubes. Steven admits his true history with Martin to Anna, as well as that he had two drinks before operating on Martin's father. After witnessing Kim stand up when Martin tells her to do so over the phone and become paralyzed again when he hangs up, Anna is convinced that Martin has some sort of power, so she visits him to ask why she and her children should suffer for Steven's mistake. He says it is the closest thing that he can think of to justice.

Eventually, Kim and Bob are sent home. When Anna castigates Steven for both causing and not solving their predicament, he kidnaps Martin and ties him up in his basement. He beats Martin and shoots him in the leg, but Martin is not intimidated. The children argue over whom their father will choose to kill and try to curry his favor. Steven asks the school principal which of his children is "best". Anna tends to Martin's wounds and brings the children to see him, but fails to elicit any sympathy. She then tells Steven that he should kill one of the children, not her, because she can have another child. Kim fails to persuade Martin to heal her so they can run away together and then tells Steven how much she loves her family and offers her life to save theirs. Finally, hopeless, Anna releases Martin.

When Bob begins bleeding from his eyes, which Martin said would happen a few hours before death, Steven places him, Kim, and Anna in a circle, bound with duct tape, and covers their heads. Steven pulls a woolen hat over his face, spins around, and fires a rifle. He narrowly misses Kim and Anna, but the third shot kills Bob.

Some time later, Martin, his face still somewhat bruised, enters the diner where he and Steven used to meet. The remaining Murphys are inside and promptly leave. Martin watches as they go. Steven avoids his gaze, Anna shoots him an icy glare, and Kim, who is healed, glances back before walking out the door.

Cast

 Colin Farrell as Steven Murphy
 Nicole Kidman as Anna Murphy
 Barry Keoghan as Martin Lang
 Raffey Cassidy as Kimberly "Kim" Murphy
 Sunny Suljic as Robert "Bob" Murphy
 Alicia Silverstone as Martin's Mother
 Bill Camp as Matthew Williams
 Barry Bernson as Dr. Larry Banks
 Herb Caillouet as Ed Thompson (Hospital Director)
 Denise Dal Vera as Mary Williams
 Drew Logan as Principal
 Michael Trester as Elderly Man
 Ming Wang as Doctor (Abdominal)

Production
On 11 May 2016, it was announced that Farrell had been cast in the film, with Lanthimos directing from a screenplay he wrote with Filipou, and Film4 Productions and Element Pictures producing. Kidman was cast that June, and Silverstone, Cassidy, Camp, Keoghan, and Suljic joined the project in August.

By 23 August 2016, the film had begun principal photography at The Christ Hospital in Cincinnati. Shooting also took place in the Hyde Park and Northside neighborhoods of the city.

Release
In May 2016, A24 acquired the film's U.S. distribution rights and Haut et Court acquired the French distribution rights. The film had its world premiere on 22 May 2017 at the 70th Cannes Film Festival, where Lanthimos and Filippou won the Best Screenplay award. It began its theatrical release on 20 October 2017 in the United States, and on 3 November 2017 in the United Kingdom and Ireland.

Reception

Critical response
On Metacritic, the film has a weighted average score of 73 out of 100, based on 45 critics, indicating "generally favorable reviews".

The Killing of a Sacred Deer was named "one of the best horror movies of the year" by Joey Keogh of Wicked Horror, who called it "horror in its purest, most distilled form, freed from the shackles of jump scares or exposition." Keogh wrote that Keoghan is the film's "ace card", giving "his best, most self-assured performance to date" as Martin, the "supremely frightening yet weirdly charismatic creation who makes even the act of eating spaghetti seem terrifying." Zhuo-Ning Su of Awards Daily wrote that the film is "less complex than [Lanthimos's] previous work but engrosses and unsettles all the same", adding that it "palpably improves" in its second hour. While praising the cast, particularly Kidman, Su added that Keoghan "shines brightest as the plain but charismatic boy who's somehow not quite right", calling his performance "vivid" and "fully realised".

In a mixed review, Nicholas Bell of ION Cinema wrote that the "mysterious, highly metaphorical" film, which he compared to "something from the Old Testament", "finds the director getting a bit too hung up on his own idiosyncrasies." He also criticized Lanthimos's and Filippou's "overtly precise dialogue", which he felt "straitjacketed" the actors, but he praised director of photography Thimios Bakatakis and the "eerie" score. Bell summarized the film as "interesting, but a bit too ambiguous to remain as uncomfortably off-putting as it hopes".

Trace Thurman gave the film a five-star review in Bloody Disgusting, saying it would be "the most unsettling film you see this year" and giving particular credit to Lanthimos's direction and Bakatakis's cinematography, which he said give the film a "surreal, otherworldly quality". Thurman also praised the cast, writing that Farrell and Kidman "deliver their lines with a stilted coldness that sends chills up the spine", and calling the younger actors "equally impressive, with Keoghan being the standout. He gives an eerie performance that you believe to be that of a psychopath". Also writing for Bloody Disgusting, Benedict Seal gave the film a one-star review, stating that it had "none of the escalating intrigue and tension" of The Gift and The Witch, both released in 2015. Seal added that the film plays out "mechanically" after the reveal in the middle and said the visuals were "striking at times" but became "monotonous and garish", before summing up the film as "the biggest bum note yet from one of the most overrated directors in the art-house world" and "an epic embarrassment".

Accolades

References

External links

 
 
 

2017 films
2017 horror thriller films
2017 psychological thriller films
2017 thriller drama films
2010s horror drama films
2010s psychological drama films
2010s psychological horror films
British horror drama films
British horror thriller films
British psychological thriller films
British thriller drama films
2017 independent films
English-language Irish films
Filicide in fiction
Film4 Productions films
Films about curses
Films about dysfunctional families
Films about surgeons
Films based on works by Euripides
Films directed by Yorgos Lanthimos
Films set in Cincinnati
Films shot in Cincinnati
Films shot in Kentucky
Irish horror thriller films
Irish thriller drama films
Modern adaptations of works by Euripides
Fiction about sacrifices
Works based on Iphigenia in Aulis
2010s English-language films
2010s British films